Godthåbhallen is a handball stadium in Nuuk, Greenland. It is the home of the Greenland men's national handball team. The stadium has a capacity of 1,000 people.

The stadium was built in 1961, and is a multi-purpose venue, housing events ranging from concerts to bingo to zumba and bodytoning. The stadium used to be the venue of choice for bigger artists, but since the 2002 completion of Nuuk Stadium, home of the Nuuk football team, all major artists use this newer, spacier venue. Godthåbhallen is located 400 meters from Nuuk Stadium. An ice skating arena which is open to the public is right outside the hall.

Godthåbhallen hosted the futsal tournaments at the 2016 Arctic Winter Games.

References

Buildings and structures in Nuuk
Multi-purpose stadiums in Greenland
Sport in Nuuk
Indoor arenas in Greenland